Homonoia is a plant genus of the family Euphorbiaceae first described in 1790. These are rheophytes and usually found in groups at riverbanks in India, southern China, Southeast Asia, and New Guinea.

Species
 Homonoia intermedia Haines - India 
 Homonoia retusa (Graham ex Wight) Müll.Arg. - India, Vietnam 
 Homonoia riparia Lour. - Guangxi, Guizhou, Hainan, Sichuan, Taiwan, Yunnan, Cambodia, India, Assam, Bhutan, Sri Lanka, Borneo, Java, Lesser Sunda Islands, Sulawesi, Sumatra, Maluku, Laos, Malaysia, Myanmar, Philippines, Thailand, Vietnam, New Guinea, Andaman & Nicobar Islands

formerly included
moved to other genera (Lasiococca Spathiostemon) 
 Homonoia comberi - Lasiococca comberi 
 Homonoia javensis - Spathiostemon javensis
 Homonoia pseudoverticillata - Lasiococca comberi 
 Homonoia symphyllifolia - Lasiococca symphyllifolia

References

Acalypheae
Euphorbiaceae genera